Eagris tigris, commonly known as the western tiger flat, is a species of butterfly in the family Hesperiidae. It is found in Ivory Coast, Ghana, Nigeria, Cameroon, the Central African Republic, Angola, Sudan, the Democratic Republic of the Congo and Uganda. The habitat consists of forests.

Subspecies
Eagris tigris tigris - eastern Democratic Republic of the Congo, Uganda
Eagris tigris kayonza Evans, 1956 - Uganda: south-west to the Kigezi district
Eagris tigris liberti Collins & Larsen, 2005 - Ivory Coast, Ghana, Nigeria, Cameroon, Central African Republic, Angola, southern Sudan

References

Butterflies described in 1937
Tagiadini